Han Yeong-hui (born 10 April 1973) is a South Korean swimmer. She competed in four events at the 1988 Summer Olympics.

References

External links
 

1973 births
Living people
South Korean female freestyle swimmers
Olympic swimmers of South Korea
Swimmers at the 1988 Summer Olympics
Place of birth missing (living people)